Seven referendums were held in Switzerland during 1958. The first was held on 26 January on a popular initiative "against the abuse of economic power", concerning unfair competition, and was rejected by voters. The second was held on 11 May on the federal budget, and was approved by voters. The third and fourth were held on 6 July on introducing a new section 27ter to the constitution concerning films, and a petition to improve the road network, both of which were approved. The fifth referendum was held on 26 October on instituting a 44-hour working week, and was rejected by voters. The final two were held on 7 December on a constitutional amendment on gambling and approving a treaty with Italy on a hydroelectric power scheme on the River Spöl, with both approved.

Results

January: Unfair competition

May: Federal budget

July: Constitutional amendment on films

July: Road network improvements

October: 44-hour working week

December: Constitutional amendment on gambling

December: Hydroelectric power treaty with Italy

References

1958 referendums
1958 in Switzerland
Referendums in Switzerland